Lord Portal may refer to:

 Wyndham Portal, 1st Viscount Portal (1885 – 1949), businessman and politician
 Charles Portal, 1st Viscount Portal of Hungerford (1893 – 1971), RAF officer